Mullappuzhachal is a village located in the Ernakulam district of the Indian state of  Kerala. It's a part of Ayavana Grama Panchayat and Muvattupuzha taluk. Mullappuzhachal comes under the Muvattupuzha assembly constituency which is coming under Idukki parliamentary constituency.

Places in and around Mullappuzhachal 
Consist of the following:
 Kalloorkad
Avoly
 Bethlehem
 Vazhakulam
 Ayavana

See also 

 Muvattupuzha taluk
 Vazhakulam
 Vazhakulam pineapple

References

External links 

 http://www.muvattupuzhamunicipality.in/

Villages in Ernakulam district